David Aaron Carpenter is an American violist and was the first Prize Winner of the 2006 Walter W. Naumburg Viola Competition. Along with his two siblings, the trio perform as The Carpenters, and the family, including their mother, run a family business dealing in violins, Carpenter Fine Violins.

Early life and education 
Born into a family of musical siblings, Carpenter grew up in Great Neck, Long Island, and began studying the violin at the age of six under the Suzuki method. At 12, he embarked upon learning the viola and by the time he was 16, the viola had become his primary instrument. He continued to pursue both instruments at the pre-college divisions of Juilliard School and the Manhattan School of Music, Italy’s Accademia Chigiana, Switzerland’s International Music Academy, and the Verbier Festival Academy, studying with Pinchas Zukerman, Roberto Diaz, Seiji Ozawa, Robert Mann, Nobuko Imai, Boris Belkin, and Yuri Bashmet.

Career 
Since 2003 Carpenter has been performing with leading musicians and orchestras in the United States and Europe. As the First Prize winner of the 2005 Philadelphia Orchestra Young Artists Competition, he performed the Walton Viola Concerto with the Philadelphia Orchestra under the baton of Christoph Eschenbach. He has made his recital debuts in the United States at venues as Carnegie Hall and the Kennedy Center. He made his debut in Germany with the Staatskapelle Dresden performing the Schnittke Viola Concerto. In 2008, he was Maxim Vengerov’s last-minute replacement for performances of Benjamin Yusupov's Viola, Tango, Rock Concerto with the Lucerne Symphony Orchestra in Switzerland. He has performed in the United States at Avery Fisher Hall, Chicago’s Krannert Center, and San Francisco’s Herbst Theatre, among other venues. In September, David released his first recording on the Ondine label with a viola version of the Elgar Cello Concerto (arr. Lionel Tertis/Carpenter) and the Schnittke Viola Concerto with the Philharmonia Orchestra under Christoph Eschenbach.  The disc received international acclaim and received awards such as the Editor’s Choice Award by Gramophone Magazine and Disc of the Month by The New Yorker. Carpenter was also the recipient of the 2010 Avery Fisher Career Grant.

In 2006, Carpenter was selected as a protégé by mentor Pinchas Zukerman as part of the Rolex Mentor and Protégé Arts Initiative, an international philanthropic programme that pairs masters in their disciplines with emerging talents for a year of one-to-one creative exchange.

He collaborated in recital and chamber music concerts with Emanuel Ax, Sarah Chang, Leonidas Kavakos, Sol Gabetta, Julian Rachlin, Dmitry Sitkovetsky, Jean-Yves Thibaudet, and Yuja Wang and performs regularly at the Schleswig-Holstein and Verbier Music Festivals. David was designated a Presidential Scholar and received the Presidential Gold Medal at The Kennedy Center. In addition to his musical accomplishments, David received his A.B. degree in Political Science and International Relations from Princeton University in 2008.

In April 2016, Carpenter released his debut solo album on Warner Classics, a program of 12 Seasons, including Vivaldi and Piazzolla in viola arrangement, and a new work composed specially for the Salomé Orchestra by Alexey Shor: Four Seasons of Manhattan.

Family
Carpenter performs with his two siblings, Sean and Lauren, together known as The Carpenters. With their mother, Grace, they run Carpenter Fine Violins, which deals in valuable violins.

In film
He appears with his two siblings in a 2015 documentary film directed by Australian director Scott Hicks, called Highly Strung. The film depicts attempts by the Ngeringa Arts Centre to obtain four rare and valuable Guadagnini violins for the Australian String Quartet (ASQ), and portrays the relationships within the ASQ, the wealthy arts patron, Ulrike Klein (founder of Jurlique) who purchases the violins, The Carpenters. He said of the film: "This was about the people. People who are obsessed with what they're doing. Whether they're musicians, investors, dealers... they’re all obsessed".

References

External links 
 
Rolex Mentor announcement

American classical violists
Living people
21st-century American musicians
21st-century American male musicians
21st-century classical musicians
People from Great Neck, New York
Classical musicians from New York (state)
Juilliard School alumni
Manhattan School of Music alumni
Year of birth missing (living people)
21st-century violists